Xylonymus is a genus of flowering plants belonging to the family Celastraceae.

Its native range is Maluku to New Guinea.

Species:
 Xylonymus versteeghii Kalkman

References

Celastraceae
Celastrales genera